Eisarena Salzburg is an indoor sports arena, located in Salzburg, Austria. The arena was built in 1960 and has a capacity of 3,200 people.

It is currently the home arena for the EC Red Bull Salzburg ice hockey team of the Austrian Hockey League, Red Bull Hockey Juniors of the Alps Hockey League, EC Oilers Salzburg of the Oberliga and the Ravens Salzburg of the Dameneishockey Bundesliga.

References

External links
Venue information

Indoor ice hockey venues in Austria
Sports venues in Salzburg (state)
Buildings and structures in Salzburg